Edwin Louis Garvin (October 25, 1877 – October 10, 1960) was a United States district judge of the United States District Court for the Eastern District of New York.

Education and career

Born on October 25, 1877, in Brooklyn, New York, Garvin received an Artium Baccalaureus degree in 1897 from New York University and a Bachelor of Laws in 1899 from New York University School of Law. He entered private practice in New York City, New York, from 1902 to 1915. He was a justice of the New York Court of Special Sessions from 1915 to 1918.

Federal judicial service

Garvin was nominated by President Woodrow Wilson on March 6, 1918, to a seat on the United States District Court for the Eastern District of New York vacated by Judge Van Vechten Veeder. He was confirmed by the United States Senate on March 21, 1918, and received his commission the same day. His service terminated on October 31, 1925, due to his resignation.

Later career and death

Following his resignation from the federal bench, Garvin resumed private practice in New York City starting in 1925. He was a Judge for the Kings County, New York Court in 1940. He was a justice of the Supreme Court of New York from 1941 to 1947. He was an official referee for the Supreme Court of New York from 1948 to 1960. He died on October 10, 1960, in Patchogue, New York.

References

Sources
 

Judges of the United States District Court for the Eastern District of New York
1877 births
1960 deaths
Politicians from Brooklyn
New York Supreme Court Justices
United States district court judges appointed by Woodrow Wilson
20th-century American judges